Holger Salin (18 September 1911 – ) was a Finnish footballer who played at both professional and international levels as a striker.

Career
Salin was born in Finland and played football with HIFK. Salin was the first-ever top goalscorer in the Mestaruussarja, scoring 9 goals, tied with Olof Strömsten of KIF Helsinki in 1930 and was the sole top goalscorer in 1931 with 11 goals. In total he scored 101 goals for HIFK in premier division and two in 1929 cup competition. Salin earned 22 caps for the Finland national team between 1931 and 1943, scoring 4 goals in the process. He also appeared in one FIFA World Cup qualifying match in August 1937. Salin died unexpectedly at the age of 32.

Honours

Club 
HIFK Helsinki
 Mestaruussarja: 1930, 1931

Individual 
 Mestaruussarja top scorer: 1930 (tied), 1931

References

Further reading 
 Kanerva, Juha, etc.: Jalkapallon pikkujättiläinen, pp. 461, 462, 480. WSOY, 2003. .
 Soininen, Heidi (eds.): Jalkapallokirja 2008, pp. 150, 170. Football Association of Finland, 2008. ISSN 0787-7188.

Finnish footballers
Finland international footballers
1911 births
1940s deaths
Association football forwards
Mestaruussarja players